The Day of Lower Saxony ( or TdN) is a three-day, cultural state festival in the German state of Lower Saxony, which has taken place annually since 1981. The venue is always a different Lower Saxon town.

Aim 
At the festival, the participants present the cultural diversity of the state, displaying them to a large audience. The event is intended to be a place where young and old can meet. Other purposes of the TDN are to reinforce awareness of the state, to encourage citizens to identify with their own state and to increase their sense of belonging to Lower Saxony. The TDN automatically promotes the reputation of Lower Saxony, and also helps to raise the profile of each host town. Long term, the local organizers hope to gain from a revival of tourism.

Venues

External links 
Website about the Day of Lower Saxony in 2007 in Cuxhaven
Website about the Day of Lower Saxony in 2008 in Winsen/Luhe
Website about the Day of Lower Saxony in 2009 in Hamelin
Website about the Day of Lower Saxony in 2010 in Celle

Culture of Lower Saxony
Entertainment events in Germany
Recurring events established in 1981
1981 establishments in West Germany